Glencoe Museum is located in a Victorian house in west downtown Radford, Virginia.  The house was built in 1870 in the 19th century Victorian style, specifically Second Empire, and was the postbellum home of Confederate Brigadier General Gabriel C. Wharton. It is a large, two-story, five bay, brick dwelling, and originally had quite extensive grounds.  The original house had a barn, chicken coop, smoke house, and an ice house.

The name Glencoe is thought to be inspired by Anne Wharton's ancestry.  Her family was originally from Scotland.  The house didn't appear on Radford's tax records until 1876; it took a very long time to build a house of its size and grandeur in the 1800s.  The house was kept in the family till 1996 when, after being deserted for 30 years, it was given to the city of Radford. The house and grounds were donated by the Kollmorgen Motion Technology Group.

The house features some Victorian period rooms and displays about Radford's history, including Native American artifacts, early settlers, Mary Draper Ingles, local industries, railroads, river transportation, educational institutions and local sports. There is also an art gallery with changing exhibits of the art and works of contemporary Appalachian artists.

Glencoe was listed on the National Register of Historic Places in 2000.

References

External links
 Glencoe Museum - official site

Houses in Radford, Virginia
Museums in Pulaski County, Virginia
Historic house museums in Virginia
Houses completed in 1875
Houses on the National Register of Historic Places in Virginia
Second Empire architecture in Virginia
National Register of Historic Places in Radford, Virginia